Virginia's 36th House of Delegates district elects one of 100 seats in the Virginia House of Delegates, the lower house of the state's bicameral legislature. District 36 represents part of Fairfax County, including all of Reston and parts of Herndon and Vienna. It is strongly Democratic compared to Virginia as a whole. 1 in 6 residents is Asian; the statewide average is 1 in 16. The district lines were redrawn in 2011 and 2019. The seat is currently held by Kenneth R. Plum.

District officeholders

References

Virginia House of Delegates districts
Government in Fairfax County, Virginia